Raptor, in comics, may refer to:

 Raptor (Marvel Comics), three different characters
 Raptor (G.I. Joe), a falconer for Cobra
 Raptor, a very aggressive member of XTNCT

See also
 Raptor (disambiguation)